Sea Pictures, Op. 37 is a song cycle by Sir Edward Elgar consisting of five songs written by various poets. It was set for contralto and orchestra, though a distinct version for piano was often performed by Elgar. Many mezzo-sopranos have sung the piece.

The songs are:
 "Sea Slumber Song" by Roden Noel (approximately 4 minutes)
 "In Haven (Capri)" by Caroline Alice Elgar, the composer's wife (under 2 minutes)
 "Sabbath Morning at Sea" by Elizabeth Barrett Browning (approximately 4 minutes)
 "Where Corals Lie" by Richard Garnett (approximately 3 minutes)
 "The Swimmer" by Adam Lindsay Gordon (approximately 5 minutes)

Much of the vocal line of the first song, "Sea Slumber Song", is heard again in other parts of the cycle; most notably, the second stanza is heard again almost in its entirety as part of the finale.

History 
Elgar composed the piece on his 1894 Broadwood Square piano while residing at Birchwood Lodge, Great Storridge in Herefordshire. The songs were originally written in high keys for a soprano voice, but transposed to lower keys for the orchestral version, largely at the request of the contralto Clara Butt. The songs were composed in July 1899 (apart from "In Haven (Capri)", which was a reworking of his 1897 "Love alone will stay").

The premiere was on 5 October 1899 at the Norfolk and Norwich Festival with Elgar himself conducting and Clara Butt singing, dressed as a mermaid. On 7 October, Clara Butt gave the first London performance at St. James's Hall, with Elgar at the piano. Nearly two weeks later, on 20 October, Butt performed it for Queen Victoria at Balmoral.

Until August 1900, Elgar's songs had been published by Novello: but Elgar had a disagreement with them, and from then his songs, including "The Pipes of Pan" and Sea Pictures were published by Boosey & Hawkes, who bought the copyright for £50, with a small royalty per copy of the songs published separately.

Sea Pictures was also published in the following languages:
 German: See-Bilder with words by Dr. Wilhelm Henzen
 French: Marines with words by George Petilleau.

Other versions 
While the cycle is heard most often in its canonical form for contralto and symphony orchestra, it can also be performed as a work for voice and piano, and in recent years some sopranos have taken up the work using Elgar's original keys.

In 2010, the British composer Donald Fraser made a version of Sea Pictures for SATB chorus and strings. The first recording of that version was made by the English Chamber Orchestra, Rodolfus Choir and conductor Kenneth Woods in Abbey Road Studios in 2013. Fraser's arrangement was hailed by Stephen Johnson in BBC Music Magazine as "beautifully realised, performed with warmth and understanding, and sympathetically recorded."

Fraser has also made a version of the work for SATB chorus and large symphony orchestra.

Recording 

The first recording, of "In Haven" and "Where Corals Lie", was made on 10 November 1922, by Leila Megane (contralto) with Elgar conducting the Royal Albert Hall Orchestra. The same parties recorded the remaining three songs on 8 January 1923. These acoustic recordings were made for The Gramophone Company and appeared under the H.M.V. label, on 2 discs D674-5. This can be heard on The Elgar Edition GEMMCDS 9951–5 (Pavilion Records)
Larisa Avdeyeva, USSR State Symphony Orchestra, Yevgeny Svetlanov. Edward Elgar Sea Pictures & Symphony No. 2 (recorded live at the Grand Hall of the Moscow State Conservatory, 11 April 1977. Sung in Russian; translations by Natalia Rozhdestvenskaya). Scribendum SC 032
Janet Baker, London Symphony Orchestra, conductor Sir John Barbirolli (1965) is available on many EMI CDs (only some of which include texts), for example Elgar: Cello Concerto; Cockaigne; Sea Pictures, EMI Classics 5 62886 2
 Dame Janet Baker, London Philharmonic Orchestra, Vernon Handley London Philharmonic Orchestra plays Elgar LPO – LPO0016-0020 (recorded live 1984)
Rodolfus Choir, English Chamber Orchestra, Kenneth Woods. 2013, recorded on 31 July 2013 in Abbey Road Studios. Avie Records AV2362. Version for SATB choir and string orchestra arr. Donald Fraser, coupled with Fraser's orchestration of Elgar's Piano Quintet.
Muriel Brunskill Elgar's Interpreters on Record Volume 2 – Historic Recordings (also includes recording by Clara Butt) Dutton CDAX8020
Clara Butt, Unidentified Orchestra, Hamilton Harty "Where corals lie" only. Dame Clara Butt (1872–1936) Prima Voce NI 7912. (Recording is also on Dame Clara Butt: Britain's Queen of Song GEM 0086)
 Elizabeth Campbell, Adelaide Symphony Orchestra, Nicholas Braithwaite Elgar: Cello Concerto/Sea Pictures ABC Classics 4767966
Yvonne Minton, London Philharmonic Orchestra, Daniel Barenboim. Elgar. CD collection of former recordings, 2002. Sony Classical 508249 2
Sarah Connolly, Bournemouth Symphony Orchestra, Simon Wright Elgar: Music Makers / Sea Pictures Naxos 8.557710. This recording was a 2007 Grammy nominee, for the Grammy Award for Best Classical Vocal Performance
Alice Coote, The Hallé, Sir Mark Elder, recorded on 5–7 August 2014, Manchester.
Margreta Elkins, Queensland Symphony Orchestra, Werner Andreas Albert (August 1983) Margreta Elkins – The Classic Recordings ABC 461,922-2
Lauris Elms, Sydney Symphony Orchestra, John Hopkins LP RCA GL40749
 Linda Finnie, London Philharmonic Orchestra, Bryden Thomson, (1991). Elgar: Sea Pictures, The Music Makers Chandos Records 9022
Birgit Finnilä, Geoffrey Parsons (piano). Baroque and Romantic Vocal Music BIS-CD-127
Bernadette Greevy, London Philharmonic Orchestra, Vernon Handley Elgar: Symphony No.2 / Sea Pictures Cfp 5753062
Aafje Heynis, "Sea Slumber Song" only. Het Puik van zoete kelen (The Cream of Glorious Voices) Philips Dutch Masters 464,385-2 "Sea Slumber Song" audio sample
Marilyn Horne, New York Philharmonic Orchestra, Zubin Mehta, recorded on 6 June 1980, New York.
Konrad Jarnot (baritone), Reinild Mees (piano) Elgar: Complete Songs for Voice and Piano Vol. 1 Channel Classics Records CCS SA 27507
Mary Jarred, contralto; The BBC Orchestra, Section F; Clarence Raybould, conductor Elgar's Interpreters on Record, Volume 5: Broadcasts from the Leech Collection at the British Library (1935–1950) Elgar Society EECD003-005 ("Sea Slumber Song" complete, "Sabbath Morning at Sea" to bar 84, "The Swimmer" bars between 74 and 107 are missing)
Della Jones, Royal Philharmonic Orchestra, Charles Mackerras The British Music Collection – Edward Elgar Decca 4732492
 Rosemarie Lang, Helsingborg Symphony Orchestra, Hans-Peter Frank c/w Wagner Wesendonck Lieder and Gösta Nystroem Sănger vid havet (Songs at the Sea) Wagner / Nystroem / Elgar: Lieder BIS-CD-530
 Claire-Louise Lucas (mezzo-soprano), Jonathan Darnborough (piano) Claudio Bohema CB5258-2 (This is the version with piano accompaniment.)
Leila Megane, Unidentified Orchestra, Edward Elgar (first complete recording made on 11 October 1922, with Elgar conducting) available in The Elgar Edition GEMMCDS 9951–5 (Pavilion Records). Leila Megane Sain SCD2316 includes three songs from Sea Pictures.
Kerstin Meyer (mezzo-soprano), Hallé Orchestra, Sir John Barbirolli (recorded live at the St. Nicholas Chapel, King's Lynn Festival, 24 July 1970. Barbirolli's last recorded concert. Includes Elgar's Symphony No. 1). Intaglio INCD 701-1
Maartje Offers "Where Corals Lie" only. Het Puik van zoete kelen (The Cream of Glorious Voices) Philips Dutch Masters 464,385-2
Felicity Palmer, London Symphony Orchestra, Richard Hickox, Elgar Violin Concerto in B Minor, Op. 61; Cello Concerto in E Minor, Op. 85; Sea Pictures, Op. 37 Virgin 562425 2 / EMI CDM 5 65126 2
Amanda Pitt (soprano) David Owen Norris (piano) Songs & Piano Music by Edward Elgar AVIE AV 2129 (played on Elgar's 1844 Broadwood square piano and set in Elgar's original keys)
Gladys Ripley, Philharmonia Orchestra, George Weldon (Summer 1946) on HMV 78s C.3498/3500. CD release on The Dream of Gerontius and Sea Pictures Pearl GEMS 0128. Re-recorded for LP by Ripley and Weldon with the London Symphony Orchestra on 26 February 1954. Released on UK Columbia LP 33SX 1028 and US Capitol LP P-18017. Reissued on HMV Concert Classics XLP 30008. CD releases of this second version: Somm SOMMCD 073 and Pristine Audio PASC 196AS.
Birgitta Svendén, Orchestre philharmonique de Nice, John Carewe, (1991). Grands lieder [Ljudupptagning] Great songs / Mahler, Elgar, Zemlinsky Forlane UCD 16642
 Roderick Williams, BBC Concert Orchestra, Martin Yates (2010) Dutton Epoch CDLX7243
 Catherine Wyn-Rogers, BBC Symphony Orchestra, Sir Andrew Davis. (2003, recorded on 30 July 2003 in the Royal Albert Hall, London, as part of the BBC Proms), CD title is not that clear but the CD includes Walton Coronation Te Deum, Elgar Sea Pictures, Bax November Woods, Britten The Young Person's Guide to the Orchestra Warner Classics 2564 61550-2

Notes

References

Further reading 
 Elgar, Edward Sea Pictures: A Cycle of Five Songs for Contralto with German translation by Dr. Wilhelm Henzen and French words by George Petilleau Boosey & Hawkes Ltd. (Sheet music with libretti)

External links 
 The Lied, Art Song, and Choral Texts Archive Created and maintained by Emily Ezust Texts of the songs set in music by Elgar and translations in various languages.
 The Elgar Society and Elgar Foundation
 Fred Kirshnit
 The Songs of Elgar and Vaughan Williams
 Michael Kennedy Sea Pictures, Op. 37
 CD Discography of "Sea Pictures" op. 37 by Edward Elgar
 Sydney Symphony programme notes (pp. 8–11)
 

Song cycles by Edward Elgar
Classical song cycles in English
1899 compositions